Love Township is a township in Vermilion County, Illinois, USA.  As of the 2010 census, its population was 257 and it contained 105 housing units.

History
Love Township was created in 1902. It was named for a Vermilion county judge named I. A. Love.

Geography
The stream of Yankee Branch runs through this township.

Extinct towns
 Bethel
 Humrick

Adjacent townships
 McKendree Township (north)
 Eugene Township, Vermillion County, Indiana (east)
 Vermillion Township, Vermillion County, Indiana (southeast)
 Prairie Township, Edgar County (south)
 Elwood Township (west)
 Georgetown Township (northwest)

Cemeteries
The township contains three cemeteries: Bethel, Whitlock and Yankee Point.

Demographics

References
 U.S. Board on Geographic Names (GNIS)
 United States Census Bureau cartographic boundary files

External links
 US-Counties.com
 City-Data.com
 Illinois State Archives

Townships in Vermilion County, Illinois
Townships in Illinois